Precis tugela, the African leaf butterfly or eared commodore, is a butterfly of the family Nymphalidae. It is found in eastern and southern Africa, ranging from Ethiopia to South Africa. It is commonly included in the genus Precis instead of Junonia.

The wingspan is 55–60 mm in males and 58–64 mm in females.

The larvae feed on Plectranthus species and Englerastrum scandens.

Subspecies
Precis tugela tugela — eastern Zimbabwe, Eswatini, South Africa: Limpopo, Mpumalanga, KwaZulu-Natal
Precis tugela aurorina (Butler, 1894) — southern Sudan, Ethiopia, Kenya, northern and eastern Tanzania, Malawi
Precis tugela pyriformis (Butler, 1896) — western Uganda, Rwanda, Burundi, north-western Tanzania, northern Zambia, Democratic Republic of the Congo: Kivu, Shaba, Lomami, Lualaba

References

Butterflies described in 1879
Junoniini
Butterflies of Africa
Taxa named by Roland Trimen